John Autry (born February 17, 1938) was a Canadian football player who played for the Toronto Argonauts and Hamilton Tiger-Cats. He played college football at Prairie View A&M University.

References

1938 births
Toronto Argonauts players
Living people
Players of American football from Texas
Hamilton Tiger-Cats players
People from Hunt County, Texas
Prairie View A&M Panthers football players